is a Japanese actress, voice actress and singer from Tsuyama, Okayama Prefecture, Japan. She is affiliated with Production Ace. Her major roles are: Ichiyon (M14) in Upotte!!, Nadeshiko Sōma in Isuca, Freon Flamel in Sky Wizards Academy, Sōji Okita in Dai-Shogun - Great Revolution, and Shiori Itsuka in Date A Live II. She and fellow voice actress Kaori Sadohara were part of a duo called Two-Formula who sang songs on Isuca and Noucome. She announced her marriage on May 21, 2017.

Filmography

Anime

Video games

 Granado Espada (Adelina Esperanza)

Dubbing

Live-action
 American Graffiti (Budda)
 Blue Crush 2 (The Roxy Rep)
 District 9 (Phyllis Sinderson)
 Marley & Me: The Puppy Years (Axel)
 The New Daughter (Pam)
 Red Lights (Rina)
 Ruby Sparks (Mabel)
 Saw 3D (Joan, Kara)
 Scream 4 (Jenny Randall)
 Taken (Ingrid)
 Titanic (Dorothy Gibson)
 The Ward (Tammy)

Animation
 Sofia the First (James)
 Steven Universe (Sapphire)

Discography

Singles
 "Reach for Light" (Nippon Columbia, February 12, 2014) – Reached number 111 at Oricon.
 "Upon a Star" (Nippon Columbia, June 4, 2014)
 "Triage" – Saeko Zogo Feat. Nagareda Project (Nippon Columbia, April 29, 2015) – Reached number 92 at Oricon.

As Two-Formula
 "Somebody to Love" (5pb records, January 28, 2015) – ending theme song from Isuca. Reached number 135 at Oricon.
  (5pb records, November 27, 2013) – theme song from Noucome. Reached number 83 at Oricon.

References

External links
  
 
 
 Saeko Zōgō at Oricon 

1984 births
Living people
Anime singers
Japanese women singers
Japanese video game actresses
Japanese voice actresses
Voice actresses from Okayama Prefecture